Geoff Williams may refer to:

Geoff Williams (footballer) (1930–2020), Australian rules footballer
Geoff Williams (painter) (born 1957), New Zealand contemporary realist artist
Geoff Williams (squash player) (born 1957), British squash player

See also 
Jeffrey Williams (disambiguation)